Burleigh, or Burleigh Manor, or Hammonds Inheritance is a historic home located at Ellicott City, Howard County, Maryland, built on a  estate. Which included "Hammonds Inheritance" patented in 1796.
It is a Federal-style brick dwelling built between 1797 and 1810, laid in Flemish bond. Based on the 1798 Tax assessment of the Elkridge Hundred, the original manor house started as a one-story frame building 24 by 18 foot in size. Also on the landscaped grounds are a 1720 stone smokehouse; a much-altered log, stone, and frame "gatehouse" or "cottage," built in 1820 as a workhouse for slaves and another log outbuilding, as well as an early-20th century bathhouse, 1941 swimming pool, and tennis court. Portions of the estate once included the old Annapolis Road which served the property until the construction of Centennial Lane to connect Clarksville to Ellicott City in 1876. The manor was built by Colonel Rezin Hammond (1745–1809), using the same craftsmen as his brother Mathias Hammond's Hammond–Harwood House in Annapolis. Rezin and his brother Matthias were active in the colonial revolution with notable participation in the burning of the Peggy Stewart (ship). All slave labor were offered manumission upon Rezin Hammonds death in 1809, with extra provisions for tools, land and livestock for thirty two slaves. The estate was owned by Civil War veteran Colonel Mathias until his death where he was buried alongside other family members on the estate. His wife Clara Stockdale Hammond maintained ownership afterward. In 1914 the estate was owned by Mary Hanson Hammond with land totaling over  including the outbuildings and slave quarters. The manor house was renovated with the great kitchen replaced by a "Stirrup Room" where meetings of the Howard County Hunt Club were performed. The house was sold in 1941 to Mrs. Anthony J. Drexel Biddle, Jr. for  use of Prince Alexandre Hohenlohoe of Poland during WWII. St. Timothy's School bought the property after the war in 1946, but abandoned plans and sold to Mrs G. Dudley Iverson IV in 1950. The brick was once painted yellow, but by 1956, had almost returned to exposed red brick. As of 2013, it has operated as a livestock shelter.

In November 1976 the county executive, Edward L. Cochran, commissioned a $35,000 survey by Resource Management Associates Inc. to analyze  of the manor property for a landfill site at a set contract price of $2,250,000, but a task force recommendation led to a site selection in Marriottsville. In 1979 A historical survey was conducted, listing the owner as Maple Lawn developer Stewart J Greenbaum. In 1982 Burleigh was listed on the National Register of Historic Places. In 1987, the wife of former County Executive Cochran listed Burleigh Manor and 15 surrounding acres for sale for $750,000.

See also
List of Howard County properties in the Maryland Historical Trust

References

External links
, including photo from 1936, at Maryland Historical Trust

Federal architecture in Maryland
Houses completed in 1810
Houses on the National Register of Historic Places in Maryland
Howard County, Maryland landmarks
Houses in Howard County, Maryland
Historic American Buildings Survey in Maryland
Buildings and structures in Ellicott City, Maryland
National Register of Historic Places in Howard County, Maryland